Lewis Food Town, Inc., doing business as Food Town Grocery Stores, is a chain of grocery stores located in Greater Houston, founded in 1994. The headquarters are in South Houston. Ross Lewis founded it as he came out of retirement. He currently has over 40 years of Grocer experience.

 the chain had 14 stores in Greater Houston, and took a 2.57% market share in that market. As of that year the Shelby Report stated that Lewis Food Town was the sixth largest grocery store chain in Greater Houston.  the chain had 30 stores in the area. The stores are more densely located in the south part of the city.

References

External links

 
 Food Town Challenge

American companies established in 1994
Retail companies established in 1994
Supermarkets of the United States
Companies based in Houston